Lincoln Clark Andrews (1867–1950) was a brigadier general in the United States Army during World War I and Assistant Secretary of the Treasury starting in 1925. As Assistant Secretary of the Treasury, he was in charge of Prohibition enforcement. Time magazine called his forces the Prohibition Army.

Early life
He was born on November 21, 1867, in Owatonna, Minnesota, to Charles T. Andrews and Mary Clark Andrews.  He attended Cornell University from 1888 to 1889.

Military career
He attended the United States Military Academy, graduating number thirteen of fifty-one in 1893.  As a 2nd lieutenant, he commanded Troop G of the 3rd Cavalry, with which he served during the Pullman Strike riots in Chicago in 1894.

During the Spanish–American War, he served as an aide to Gen. Edwin Vose Sumner, the commanding general of the cavalry division.  After brief service as an instructor of physics at the United States Military Academy, he served in the Philippines as governor of the island of Leyte from 1899 to 1903 and participated in the campaign against the Moros.  He returned to the Academy in 1903 to teach cavalry tactics, and from 1911 to 1915, he taught cavalry tactics for the New York National Guard and also at the training camp near Plattsburgh, New York.  After returning to the Philippines in 1916 and 1917 to train the Philippine National Guard Division, he was promoted to lieutenant colonel on June 28, 1917, shortly after the American entry into World War I.

After his promotion to brigadier general, Andrews commanded the 172nd Infantry Brigade, 86th Division at Camp Grant, Illinois.  He took this brigade to France in August 1918.  Following the armistice, he served as deputy provost marshal general at general headquarters until it was disbanded.  He retired at his own request after 30 years of service on September 30, 1919.  His rank of brigadier general was restored by act on Congress in June 1930.

His publications
Basic Course for Cavalry, 1914
Fundamentals of Military Service, 1916
Leadership and Military Training, 1918
Man Power, 1921
Military Man Power, 1921

Awards
Distinguished Service Medal
Silver Citation Star
Legion of Honour
Order of the Crown of Italy

Civilian career

Andrews held the office Assistant Secretary of the Treasury, beginning in March 1925, after Roy Asa Haynes. He reorganized the bureau in 1925, resulting in the layoffs of numerous agents, including Izzy Einstein and Moe Smith in New York, who were nationally the most successful and famous team.  Andrews saw Prohibition enforcement as a technical challenge and was not an ideological adherent to the dry movement.  Andrews served until August 1, 1927.

From November 1, 1927 to June 1928, he was the president of Guardian Investment Trust in Hartford, Connecticut.

In June 1928, he became president of the Rubber Institute.

Personal life
He married Charlotte Graves on October 5, 1899.  They had one son: John G. Andrews.

He lived in Grand Isle, Vermont.

Death and legacy
He died on November 23, 1950 in Northampton, Massachusetts.  He is buried at Logan Cemetery in Hector, New York.

References

Bibliography

Davis, Henry Blaine. Generals in Khaki. Raleigh, NC: Pentland Press, 1998.  

United States Assistant Secretaries of the Treasury
1867 births
1950 deaths
United States Military Academy alumni
United States Military Academy faculty
United States Army generals of World War I
United States Army generals
Cornell University alumni
Recipients of the Distinguished Service Medal (US Army)
Recipients of the Silver Star
Recipients of the Legion of Honour
American military personnel of the Spanish–American War
People from Owatonna, Minnesota
Military personnel from Minnesota